William Frederick "Pop" Schriver (July 11, 1865 – December 27, 1932) born in Brooklyn, New York, was a baseball catcher for the Brooklyn Grays (1886), Philadelphia Quakers/Philadelphia Phillies (1888–90), Chicago Colts (1891–94), New York Giants (1895), Cincinnati Reds (1897), Pittsburgh Pirates (1898–1900) and St. Louis Cardinals (1901).

In 14 seasons he played in 800 games, had 2,727 at bats, 367 runs, 720 hits, 117 doubles, 40 triples, 16 home runs, 375 RBIs, 46 stolen bases, 223 walks, .264 batting average, .329 on-base percentage, .354 slugging percentage, 965 total bases and 33 sacrifice hits.

He died in New York City.

A Washington Post article reported on August 26, 1894, that on the 25th, "Pop" Schriver caught a ball tossed by his teammate Clark Griffith from the observation deck of the Washington Monument (505 feet). Griffith reported later that Schriver "couldn't hold it and it plopped out," so Schriver's claim to the first catch from the Monument is questioned. 
The feat was successfully completed by Washington Senators catcher Charles E. "Gabby" Street on Aug. 21, 1908.

References

Sources

External links
 

1865 births
1932 deaths
Major League Baseball catchers
Baseball players from New York (state)
Sportspeople from Brooklyn
Baseball players from New York City
Brooklyn Grays players
Philadelphia Quakers players
Philadelphia Phillies players
Chicago Colts players
New York Giants (NL) players
Cincinnati Reds players
Pittsburgh Pirates players
St. Louis Cardinals players
19th-century baseball players
Jersey City Skeeters players
Scranton Indians players
Milwaukee Brewers (minor league) players
Scranton Coal Heavers players
Minneapolis Millers (baseball) players
Colorado Springs Millionaires players
Pueblo Indians players
Harrisburg Senators players
Kansas City Blues (baseball) managers